{{DISPLAYTITLE:5-HT5A receptor}}

5-Hydroxytryptamine (serotonin) receptor 5A, also known as HTR5A, is a protein that in humans is encoded by the HTR5A gene. Agonists and antagonists for 5-HT receptors, as well as serotonin uptake inhibitors, present promnesic (memory-promoting) and/or anti-amnesic effects under different conditions, and 5-HT receptors are also associated with neural changes.

Function 

The gene described in this record is a member of 5-hydroxytryptamine receptor family and encodes a multi-pass membrane protein that functions as a receptor for 5-hydroxytryptamine and couples to G proteins, negatively influencing cAMP levels via Gi and Go. This protein has been shown to function in part through the regulation of intracellular Ca2+ mobilization. The 5-HT5A receptor has been shown to be functional in a native expression system.

Rodents have been shown to possess two functional 5-HT5 receptor subtypes, 5-HT5A and 5-HT5B, however while humans possess a gene coding for the 5-HT5B subtype, its coding sequence is interrupted by stop codons, making the gene non-functional, and so only the 5-HT5A subtype is expressed in human brain.

It also appears to serve as a presynaptic serotonin autoreceptor.

Clinical significance 

The neurotransmitter serotonin (5-hydroxytryptamine, 5-HT) has been implicated in a wide range of psychiatric conditions and also has vasoconstrictive and vasodilatory effects.

Selective ligands 

Few highly selective ligands are commercially available for the 5-HT5A receptor. When selective activation of this receptor is desired in scientific research, the non-selective serotonin receptor agonist 5-Carboxamidotryptamine can be used in conjunction with selective antagonists for its other targets (principally 5-HT1A, 5-HT1B, 5-HT1D, and 5-HT7). Research in this area is ongoing.

Agonists 
LSD:(+)-lysergic acid, 
Lisuride, partial agonist.
5-CT, full agonist.
Methylergometrine, full agonist.
 Valerenic acid, a component of valerian, has been shown to act as a 5HT5A partial agonist.
Olanzapine, an atypical antipsychotic.
Psilocin 
 Another ligand that has been recently disclosed is shown below, claimed be a selective 5-HT5A agonist with Ki = 124 nM.

Antagonists 

 ASP-5736
 AS-2030680
 AS-2674723
 MS112, selective potent antangonist.
 Latrepirdine (non-selective)
 Risperidone (non-selective), moderate 206 nM affinity.
 SB-699,551

See also 
 5-HT receptor
 5-HT1 receptor
 5-HT2 receptor
 5-HT3 receptor
 5-HT4 receptor
 5-HT6 receptor
 5-HT7 receptor

References

Further reading

External links 
 
 

Serotonin receptors